Noodle Kidoodle was an American retail chain that sold educational toys from 1993 to 2000.

The company's slogan was "Kids learn best when they're having fun!". The chain operated stores in New York, New Jersey, Connecticut, Massachusetts, New Hampshire, Michigan, Illinois, Kansas, Nebraska and Texas. The company was founded by Stanley Greenman, who has previously operated large-store chains such as Circus World, Play World and Playland, through his family business Greenman Bros. Inc.

The first store was opened in 1993, in Greenvale, New York. In December 1995, Greenman Bros. Inc., the parent company of Noodle Kidoodle, was renamed Noodle Kidoodle Inc. In 2000, Noodle Kidoodle was acquired by Zany Brainy. Zany Brainy paid $35 million for 60 stores. The new company was headquartered in Zany Brainy's main offices in King of Prussia, Pennsylvania.

References

Defunct retail companies of the United States
Privately held companies based in New York (state)
Companies based in Nassau County, New York
Retail companies disestablished in 2000
Defunct companies based in New York (state)
Toy retailers of the United States
Educational toy retailers
Retail companies established in 1931
1931 establishments in New York (state)
2000 disestablishments in New York (state)